Paula Akana is a Hawaii-based journalist and executive director at The Friends of Iolani Palace in Honolulu. She was formerly a broadcast television journalist with KITV Island News.

Akana attended the Kamehameha Schools. Akana then earned a Bachelor of Arts degree in journalism with a minor in Hawaiian anthropology and archeology from the University of Hawaii at Manoa.

References 

Living people
American television journalists
Kamehameha Schools alumni
American women television journalists
University of Hawaiʻi at Mānoa alumni
21st-century American journalists
Year of birth missing (living people)